Choros may refer to:

 Choros (Oirats), a Mongolic people and historical clan
 Chôros, a series of compositions by Heitor Villa-Lobos
 Choros (dance), Greek dances
 Choros (Greek drama), an ancient Greek group of performers
 Choros District, a subdivision of Cutervo, Peru
 , one of the islands of the Pingüino de Humboldt National Reserve, Chile

See also
 Choro
 Khoros (disambiguation)